Elections to local bodies (Panchayats, Municipalities and Corporations) in Kerala were held in two phrases, on 2 and 5 November 2015. The Left Democratic Front (LDF) won more than half of all gram panchayats and municipalities, and both they and the United Democratic Front (UDF) won majorities in seven out of fourteen district panchayats each. The LDF also won two corporations, the UDF won one, and the remaining three had no overall majority.

Background 
Kerala Panchayat Raj Act, 1994 made provisions for the creation of local bodies at the village, block and district levels. The Kerala Municipalities Act, 1994 made provisions for the creation of municipalities and corporations.

In total, Kerala has 1200 local self-governing bodies941 gram panchayats, 14 district panchayats, 152 block panchayats, 87 municipalities, 77 taluks, and 6 corporations.

Parties and coalitions
There are three major political coalitions in Kerala. The Left Democratic Front (LDF) is the coalition of left wing and far-left parties, led by the Communist Party of India (Marxist) (CPI(M)). The United Democratic Front (UDF) is the coalition of centrist and centre-left parties led by the Indian National Congress. The National Democratic Alliance is led by the right-wing Bharatiya Janata Party.

Campaign 
Chief Minister Oommen Chandy said the election results would be a verdict on his government. Former Chief Minister A. K. Antony cited that the local body elections were the semifinals to the forthcoming 2016 elections. Allegations of the finance minister of the state K. M. Mani accepting bribes from bar owners was made a focal point of the campaign by opposition parties.

The Bharatiya Janata Party (BJP) forged an alliance with SNDP in a bid to win the Ezhava community votes. UDF had rebel candidates in various panchayats and municipalities. Twenty20, an organisation backed by Kitex Group contested in Kizhakkambalam grama panchayat.

Result

Local Body Wise Results

Ward-Wise Results

Aftermath 
Kerala Pradesh Congress Committee (KPCC) president V. M. Sudheeran said that the results show that the UDF base had not been affected much. BJP state president V. Muraleedharan stated that it was impossible to fight an election in Kerala without taking their alliance into account.

Twenty20 won 17 of 19 seats in Kizhakkambalam gram panchayat, thereby becoming the first corporate-ruled local body in Kerala.

A Indian National Congress candidate for Mananthavady municipality, who was the Congress District Committee secretary, committed suicide after coming in third place.

See also 

 Elections in Kerala
 2020 Kerala local body elections
 2011 Kerala Legislative Assembly election
 2016 Kerala Legislative Assembly election

Notes

References

External links 
 

 
Kerala local
2015